Barbados is a continental island in the North Atlantic Ocean and is located at 13°10' north of the equator, and 59°32' west of the Prime Meridian. As the easternmost isle of the Lesser Antilles in the West Indies, Barbados lies 160 kilometres (100 mi) east of the Windward Islands and Caribbean Sea. Of the total EEZ area, 70,000 km2 is set aside for offshore oil exploration. A pending application to UNCLOS has placed for consideration a continental shelf  to the east and south (or to the edge of the continental margin). To the west, most of Barbados' maritime boundaries consist of median lines with neighbours. These neighbours include: Martinique, and Saint Lucia to the northwest, Saint Vincent and the Grenadines to the west, Trinidad and Tobago and Venezuela to the southwest, and Guyana to the southeast.

Sometimes compared to a pear or leg of mutton for its physical shape.

Physical characteristics
The physical characteristics of Barbados are its lowlands or gently sloping, terraced plains, separated by rolling hills that generally parallel the coasts. Elevations in the interior range from 180 to 240 meters above sea level. Mount Hillaby is the highest point at 340 meters above sea level. Farther south, at Christ Church Ridge, elevations range from sixty to ninety meters. Eighty-five percent of the island's surface consists of coralline limestone twenty-four to thirty meters thick; Scotland District contains outcroppings of oceanic formations at the surface, however. Sugarcane is planted on almost 80 percent of the island's limestone surface. The soils vary in fertility; erosion is a problem, with crop loss resulting from landslides, washouts, and falling rocks. Most of the small streams are in Scotland District. The rest of the island has few surface streams; nevertheless, rainwater saturates the soil to produce underground channels such as the famous Coles Cave. Also notable in the island is the rocky cape known as Pico Teneriffe or Pico de Tenerife, which is named after the fact that the island of Tenerife in Spain is the first land east of Barbados according to the belief of the locals.

Populated places 
List of: Cities, towns and villages in Barbados.
Bridgetown
Holetown
Oistins
Six Cross Roads
Speightstown
Saint Lawrence Gap
Warrens
Black Rock, Barbados
Bank Hall

Proposed developments 
In 2009 and 2010, members of the upscale real estate industry in Barbados proposed the creation of artificial islands to be placed off the west coast. Both proposed islands would be a short distance from the Deep Water Harbour in Bridgetown.

The south-eastern part of the island has undergone small scale oil and gas capturing from possibly as early as 1919 when the British Union Oil Company acquired over 75% of the drilling rights in Barbados. Similar to Trinidad and Tobago to the southwest, the territorial Atlantic Ocean surrounding Barbados has been found to contain fossil fuels, however ongoing research is being conducted to give estimates of actual quantities.

Time zone
Barbados is in the Eastern Caribbean Time Zone.  Barbados no longer observes Daylight Saving Time.  It was last used between Sunday, 20 April 1980 at 2:00 AM and Thursday, 25 September 1980 at 2:00 AM.  On 25 September of that year the clock was shifted from -3:00 to -4:00, where it has remained since.

Statistics

Location

 Map references
 Central America and the Caribbean

Area
 Total: 430 km²
 Land: 430 km²
 Water: 0 km²

Area comparative
 Australia comparative: less than one-fifth of the area of the Australian Capital Territory
 Canada comparative: slightly larger than London in the Province of Ontario
 United Kingdom comparative: slightly larger than the Isle of Wight or Saint Helena
 United States comparative: 2.5 times the size of Washington, DC, about the size of San Antonio, Texas, or half the size of New York City

Land boundaries
 0 km
 Coastline
 97 km
 Maritime claims
 Territorial sea: 
 Exclusive economic zone:  and

Climate
 Tropical; rainy season (June to October)

Terrain
 Relatively flat; rises gently to central highland region
 Extreme points
 Northernmost point – North Point, Saint Lucy
 Southernmost point – South Point, Silver Sands, Christ Church
 Westernmost point – Harrison Point, Saint Lucy
 Easternmost point – Kitridge Point, Saint Philip
 Lowest point: Atlantic Ocean: 0 m
 Highest point: Mount Hillaby: 336 m

Natural resources
 Fish, natural gas

Land use
 Arable land: 25.58%
 Permanent crops: 2.33%
 Other: 72.09% (2012)
 Irrigated land
 54.35 km² (2003)
 Total renewable water sources
 0.08 cu km (2011)
 Freshwater withdrawal (domestic/industrial/agricultural)
 total: 0.1 cu km/yr (20%/26%/254)
 per capita: 371.3 cu m/yr (200p)

Natural hazards 
 Infrequent hurricanes; periodic landslides; periodic flooding, from storm surge and intense rainfall events; and occasional droughts, causing fires.

Environment - current issues
 Pollution of coastal waters from waste disposal by ships; soil erosion; illegal solid waste disposal threatens contamination of aquifers
 Environment - international agreements
 Party to: Biodiversity, Climate Change, Climate Change-Kyoto Protocol, Desertification, Endangered Species, Hazardous Wastes, Law of the Sea, Marine Dumping, Ozone Layer Protection, Ship Pollution, Wetlands
 Signed, but not ratified: none of the selected agreements
 Geography - note
 Easternmost Caribbean island

Climate 
Barbados lies within the tropics. Its generally pleasant maritime climate is influenced by northeast trade winds, which moderate the tropical temperature. Cool, northeasterly trade winds are prevalent during the December to June dry season. Humidity levels are between 71 percent and 76 percent year round. Rainfall occurs primarily between July and December and varies considerably with elevation.

Disputes
Guyana's and Barbados's offshore territorial claims overlap, and are also disputed with Venezuela, which itself claims ownership of the waters overlapping the first two. In 2008 Barbados sought to place the oil blocks on open market for oil exploration tender but faced a challenge by Venezuela's government in Caracas.

In 2006 a local Barbadian group purporting to represent descendants of indigenous Caribbean peoples announced its claim to Culpepper Island, a small rocky outcrop on the eastern shore of Barbados.

Oceanography
Due to the location of Barbados far east of Windward Islands chain it possesses an expansive Exclusive Economic Zone of about  extending predominantly to the east.

Notes

References 
 
 
 
 
 
 
 
 Caves and landslips in Barbados - September 16, 2007: Barbados Advocate
 Geography & Climate of Barbados - Barbados Government
Earthwise Issue 14, Landslides and tourist development - The slow slide of eastern Barbados into the sea, British Geological Survey
 Plantation and Peasant Farm A Vertical Theme in the Historical Geography of Barbados 1627 - 1960 by Frank Cecil Innes, M.A., B.Sc, September, 1967, Doctor of Philosophy, Dept. of Geography, McGil1 Univ.

See also
English place names in Barbados

External links 
 Caribbean-On-Line.com provides detailed maps of Barbados.
 Districts of Barbados, Statoids.com
 GEOnet Names Server
 BajanNAV - Free satellite navigation software for Barbados
 Barbados Geography geographic profile of Barbados.
 Encyclopedia.com Worldmark Encyclopedia of Nations.
 Encyclopaedia Britannica, Inc. Physical Geography

 
Islands of Barbados
Lesser Antilles